Sándor Kulcsár (also known as Alexandru Culcear; born 16 July 1965) is a Romanian former professional football player and manager of Hungarian ethnicity.

Club career
Born in Pericei, Kulcsár started his football career at FC Bihor Oradea for which he played in two Liga II season. In the 1987–88 season he scored 23 goals for the red and blues, being transferred at Victoria București, club owned by the miliția and managed by Dumitru Dragomir. Every player that signed with Victoria was automatically enrolled in the miliția, but Kulcsár was a Hungarian ethnic, so the Romanian Communist Party forced him to change his name into one with a Romanian resonance, being known between 1988 and 1990 as Alexandru Culcear. In 1990 the Ceaușescu's dictatorship fell and Victoria was dissolved, being accused of misleading performances. Kulcsár returned for 2 seasons at Bihor Oradea until the club relegated in the second league. From 1992 until his retirement Sándor played in Hungary for various clubs such as: Békéscsaba Előre, Diósgyőr, Ferencváros or Nyíregyháza Spartacus, among others.

Manager career
In 2009 he was for a short period the assistant manager of Ovidiu Lazăr at Bihor Oradea.

References

External links
 
 Sándor Kulcsár at nela.hu
 Sándor Kulcsár at bksc.hu

1965 births
Living people
People from Sălaj County
Romanian sportspeople of Hungarian descent
Romanian footballers
Association football forwards
Liga I players
Liga II players
FC Bihor Oradea players
Victoria București players
Nemzeti Bajnokság I players
Békéscsaba 1912 Előre footballers
Diósgyőri VTK players
Ferencvárosi TC footballers
BFC Siófok players
Nyíregyháza Spartacus FC players
Bőcs KSC footballers
Romanian expatriate footballers
Romanian expatriate sportspeople in Hungary
Expatriate footballers in Hungary